Lucas Florent Claerbout (born 22 October 1992) is a French badminton player. He started playing badminton at Union Sportive Talence club in 2010, then in 2014, he joined the national team. Claerbout won the men's singles title in 2018 French National Championships. He along national team won the silver medal at the 2016 European Men's Team Championships in Kazan, Russia.

Achievements

BWF World Tour 
The BWF World Tour, which was announced on 19 March 2017 and implemented in 2018, is a series of elite badminton tournaments sanctioned by the Badminton World Federation (BWF). The BWF World Tour is divided into levels of World Tour Finals, Super 1000, Super 750, Super 500, Super 300, and the BWF Tour Super 100.

Men's singles

BWF International Challenge/Series (4 titles, 5 runners-up) 
Men's singles

Men's doubles

  BWF International Challenge tournament
  BWF International Series tournament
  BWF Future Series tournament

References

External links 

 
 
 

1992 births
Living people
Sportspeople from Bordeaux
French male badminton players
Badminton players at the 2010 Summer Youth Olympics